Harihar Swain (11 November 1939 – 13 October 2012) was a member of the 14th Lok Sabha of India. He represented the Aska constituency of Odisha on a Biju Janata Dal ticket.
He was expelled from the Biju Janata Dal after voting against the party whip.
It was alleged that he had taken a bribe to vote against his own party. He was suffering from multiple ailments and died on 13 October 2012.

References

External links
 Members of Fourteenth Lok Sabha - Parliament of India website

1939 births
2012 deaths
People from Odisha
Biju Janata Dal politicians
Indian National Congress politicians
India MPs 2004–2009
Lok Sabha members from Odisha
People from Ganjam district